Dudhkomra  is a village in Chanditala I community development block of Srirampore subdivision in Hooghly district in the Indian state of West Bengal.

Geography
Dudhkomra is located at

Gram panchayat
Villages in Haripur gram panchayat are: Anantarampur, Bade Sola, Baghati, Ban Panchbere, Chak Bangla, Chota Choughara, Dudhkomra, Haripur, Ichhapasar, Jagmohanpur, Mamudpur and Radhaballabhpur.

Demographics
As per 2011 Census of India, Dudhkomra had a total population of 1,692 of which 866 (51%) were males and 826 (49%) were females. Population below 6 years was 160. The total number of literates in Dudhkomra was 1,355 (88.45% of the population over 6 years).

References 

Villages in Chanditala I CD Block